Under Suspicion is a 1919 British silent drama film directed by Walter West and starring Horace Hunter, Hilda Bayley and Cameron Carr.

Cast
 Horace Hunter as Major Paul Holt  
 Hilda Bayley as Countess Nada  
 Jack Jarman as Her Brother  
 Cameron Carr as Count Vasiloff  
 Arthur Walcott as Peter Kharolff  
 Dorothy Warren as Marie Petrovsky  
 Henry Latimer as General Norvaard

References

Bibliography
 Palmer, Scott. British Film Actors' Credits, 1895-1987. McFarland, 1998.

External links
 

1919 films
1919 drama films
British drama films
British silent feature films
1910s English-language films
Films directed by Walter West
British black-and-white films
1910s British films
Silent drama films